Nathalie Gonzalez (born 9 April 1995) is a Luxembourgish footballer who plays as a midfielder and has appeared for the Luxembourg women's national team.

Career
Gonzalez has been capped for the Luxembourg national team, appearing for the team during the 2019 FIFA Women's World Cup qualifying cycle.

References

External links
 
 
 

1995 births
Living people
Luxembourgian women's footballers
Luxembourg women's international footballers
Women's association football midfielders